The women's tournament of basketball at the 2013 Summer Universiade in Kazan was held from July 8 to July 15.

Teams

Preliminary round

Group A

|}

Group B

|}

Group C

|}

Group D

|}

Classification rounds

Quarterfinal round

9th–16th place

Semifinal round

13th–16th place

9th–12th place

5th–8th place

Final round

15th-place game

13th-place game

11th-place game

9th-place game

7th-place game

5th-place game

Elimination round

Quarterfinals

Semifinals

Bronze-medal game

Gold-medal game

Final standings

References

2013
Women's
2013 in Russian women's sport
2013 in women's basketball
International women's basketball competitions hosted by Russia